Alessandro Vinícius Gonçalves da Silva (born 15 February 1999), commonly known as Alessandro Vinícius, is a Brazilian footballer who plays as an attacking midfielder for Joinville, on loan from Atlético Mineiro.

Career statistics

Club

References

1999 births
Living people
Brazilian footballers
Association football midfielders
Clube Atlético Mineiro players
Criciúma Esporte Clube players
Esporte Clube São José players
Villa Nova Atlético Clube players
Paysandu Sport Club players
Joinville Esporte Clube players
Campeonato Brasileiro Série C players